Bala Göyüşlü (also, Bala Gëyushlyu) is a village and municipality in the Barda Rayon of Azerbaijan.  It has a population of 306.

References 

Populated places in Barda District